Plan A may refer to:

 Plan A (album), 2022 album by Johannes Oerding
 "Plan A" (The Dandy Warhols song), 2003
 "Plan A" (Paulo Londra song), 2022
 "Plan A: Captain Cook", first episode of Blackadder Goes Forth
 Plan A Entertainment, South Korean independent record label
 Plan A (film), 2021

See also
Plan B (disambiguation)